, provisional designation , is a Tirela asteroid from the outer regions of the asteroid belt, approximately  in diameter. It was discovered on 30 August 2008, by French amateur astronomers Christophe Demeautis and Jean-Marie Lopez at the Pises Observatory in southern France.

Orbit and classification 

 is a member of the Tirela family, a large asteroid family, also known as the Klumpkea family, named after the largest members 1040 Klumpkea and 1400 Tirela. The family consists of more than a thousand members and may be further divided into 8 different parts.

It orbits the Sun in the outer asteroid belt at a distance of 2.6–3.6 AU once every 5 years and 6 months (2,009 days; semi-major axis of 3.12 AU). Its orbit has an eccentricity of 0.16 and an inclination of 18° with respect to the ecliptic.

Physical characteristics 

Based on a generic magnitude-to-diameter conversion,  measures 3.2 kilometers in diameter for an absolute magnitude of 16.0 and an assumed albedo of 0.07, which is a typical value for a Tirela asteroid. As of 2018, no rotational lightcurve has been obtained from photometric observations. The asteroid's rotation period, poles and shape remain unknown.

Numbering and naming 

This minor planet was numbered by the Minor Planet Center on 21 August 2013. As of 2018, it has not been named.

References

External links 
 Asteroid Lightcurve Database (LCDB), query form (info )
 Asteroid families classification: exploiting very large data sets, Milani et al. (2014)
 Discovery Circumstances: Numbered Minor Planets (365001)-(370000) – Minor Planet Center
 

369623
Discoveries by Christophe Demeautis
Discoveries by Jean-Marie Lopez
20080830